Sydney M. Meyer (born 15 September 1995) is a Canadian actress. She starred in the Netflix series V Wars and Shudder’s Slasher: Flesh & Blood. Her other television work includes the third season of the Freeform series Shadowhunters, Grand Army, also on Netflix, and the FX on Hulu adaptation of Y: The Last Man.

Early life and education
Meyer was born to a white British mother and a black South African father who had fled Apartheid with his family when he was younger. She grew up in London, Ontario with her two older brothers.

Sydney took classes at Lester B. Pearson School for the Arts when she was a child. Deciding normal school was not for her, she moved to Toronto at 15 to transfer from A.B. Lucas Secondary School to the Etobicoke School of the Arts. She also took summer courses at Stratford Shakespeare School and briefly danced with the Royal Winnipeg Ballet. She then went on to train at the New York Film Academy and the American Academy of Dramatic Arts in Los Angeles.

Personal life
Meyer announced her engagement to fellow Canadian actor Alex Ozerov in June 2020. They married in March 2021. They appeared alongside each other in Slasher: Flesh and Blood.

Filmography

Film

Television

References

External links

1995 births
Living people
21st-century Canadian actresses
Actresses from London, Ontario
American Academy of Dramatic Arts alumni
Canadian people of British descent
Canadian people of South African descent
Etobicoke School of the Arts alumni
New York Film Academy alumni
People with autoimmune disease
Royal Winnipeg Ballet dancers